The Brit Award for British Pop/R&B Act is an award given by the British Phonographic Industry (BPI), an organisation which represents record companies and artists in the United Kingdom. The accolade is presented at the Brit Awards, an annual celebration of British and international music. The winners and nominees were initially determined by the Brit Awards voting academy with over one-thousand members comprising record labels, publishers, managers, agents, media, and previous winners and nominees,  but starting with the 42nd Brit Awards ceremony, the award is voted by fans.

Boy band Five are the first winners of the category, while Westlife have the most wins, with two. The category was exclusively won by bands until 2006, when James Blunt became the first solo artist to receive the award. S Club 7 hold the record for most nominations without a win, with three. The current holder of the award is Harry Styles, as of 2023.

History
The award was first presented as Best British Pop Act at the 2000 Brit Awards and was retired in 2006.

In 2021, it was announced that the category had been revived and renamed Best British Pop/R&B Act following the removal of gendered categories. This new iteration of the award was first presented at the 42nd Brit Awards and the winner is voted for by the public on TikTok alongside the three other genre categories (Rock/Alternative Act, Dance Act and Hip Hop/Grime/Rap Act).

Winners and nominees

British Pop Act (2000-2006)

British Pop/R&B Act (2022-present)

Multiple nominations and awards

Notes
 Blue (2002) Busted (2004) also won Brit Award for British Breakthrough Act
 James Blunt (2006) also won Brit Award for British Male Solo Artist
 Dua Lipa (2018, 2021) also won Brit Award for British Female Solo Artist 
 Dua Lipa (2018) also won Brit Award for Best New Artist 
 Westlife (2001~2002), only foreign artist winner
 Foreign artist nominees:
 Australian: Kylie Minogue 
 Canadian: Avril Lavigne
 Ireland: Westlife 
 Spanish: Enrique Iglesias
 United States: Britney Spears, Pink, Christina Aguilera, The Black Eyed Peas, Justin Timberlake, Kelly Clarkson, Madonna

References

Brit Awards
Pop music awards
Awards established in 2000